Urtsadzor is a village in the Vedi Municipality of the Ararat Province of Armenia containing the former village of Chimankend. The village was previously the administrative capital of the Gharabaghlar District which existed in 1937–1951 in Soviet Armenia before being reattached to the Ararat Province.

Nature 
The village is located at semi-desert zone in the valley of Vedi River. There are about 15 pairs of White Storks breeding right in the village. Vicinity of the village have 131 species of butterflies and are recognized as Prime Butterfly Area. Also number of bird species are recorded inside the village (e.g. Syrian Woodpecker, Levant Sparrowhawk, etc.) and its outskirts (e.g. Lanner Falcon, Grey-headed Bunting, Isabelline Wheatear, and others).

References

External links 

World Gazeteer: Armenia – World-Gazetteer.com

Populated places in Ararat Province